"Se m'innamoro" is an Italian song composed by  Cristiano Minellono  and Dario Farina, arranged by Fio Zanotti and performed by the Europop group Ricchi e Poveri.  The song won the 35th edition of the Sanremo Music Festival. 
 
The group also recorded a Spanish version of the song titled "Si me enamoro".

In 2014 the song was included in the musical score of Carlo Vanzina's film Sapore di te.

Track listing
 
   7" single –  	BR 50333 
 "Se m'innamoro"  – 3:28  (Cristiano Minellono - Dario Farina)
 "Mami mami" – 3:48 (Cristiano Minellono - Michael Hofmann - Dario Farina)

Charts

References

1986 singles
Italo disco songs
1986 songs
Sanremo Music Festival songs 
Ricchi e Poveri songs
Songs written by Dario Farina
Songs written by Cristiano Minellono